Don Street railway station served the parish of Woodside, Aberdeen, Scotland from 1887 to 1937 on the Great North of Scotland Railway.

History 
The station was opened on 1 August 1887 by the Great North of Scotland Railway and was a stop on the Aberdeen suburban rail service. The station closed to both passengers and goods traffic on 28 February 1937.

References

External links 

Disused railway stations in Aberdeenshire
Former Great North of Scotland Railway stations
Railway stations in Great Britain opened in 1887
Railway stations in Great Britain closed in 1937
1887 establishments in Scotland
1937 disestablishments in Scotland